Oraesia is a genus of moths in the family Erebidae. The genus was erected by Achille Guenée in 1852.

Species

References

Calpinae
Moth genera